Football is the most popular sport in Turkey, followed by basketball, tracing its roots to the Ottoman Empire. The first matches were played in Ottoman Salonica in 1875. The sport was introduced by English residents. The Turkish football league system comprises five professional leagues, one of which is dedicated to female athletes.

History

League system

Süper Lig

The Süper Lig (Super League) is the top division in Turkey since 1959. The league contains 18 clubs. The champions used to receive an automatic berth in the group stage of the European Champions League until the 2020/2021 season. Galatasaray, Fenerbahçe, Beşiktaş, and Trabzonspor are the most successful Turkish clubs that participate in the competition, having won the most titles so far. Galatasaray have won the highest number of Süper Lig trophies (the club won more Süper Lig and Turkish Cup trophies than any other team), while Fenerbahçe have won the most Turkish championship titles in total to date. However, the Turkish Football Federation denies and does not recognise the titles won in the former Turkish Football Championship and National Division, even though they were official championships organised by the TFF itself.

The league ushered in clubs from all over Turkey to compete with each other. Currently, clubs finishing in the top four places in the league enter qualifying rounds of European competitions, and the winners of the Turkish Cup, if not one of the top four, are also given a spot. The three teams with the fewest points each season are relegated to the TFF First League.

The top two teams are nominated for the UEFA Champions League while the 3rd and 4th placed clubs are nominated for the UEFA Europa League.

Reserve leagues
Clubs in the Turkish football league system do not have reserve teams with the exception of Genclerbirligi and Altinordu. Hacettepe SK is the reserve side of Genclerbirligi, and Nigde Anadolu FK is of Altinordu. Other clubs have U21 and U18 teams which compete outside the main league system.

Amateur football
Below the four professional leagues in Turkish football are amateur leagues. Amateur football clubs include:
 Seniors’ First Amateur League: 2145 clubs
 Seniors’ Second Amateur League: 1743 clubs
 Seniors’ Third Amateur League: 1 club
 Women’s League: 9 clubs
 Juniors’ First Amateur League: 27 clubs
 Juniors’ Second Amateur League: 100 clubs
 Juniorslubs
 Antalya: 10 clubs
 Bursa: 16 clubs
 Istanbul: 18 clubs
 İzmir: 12 clubs
 Diyarbakır: 7 clubs
 Trabzon: 13 clubs
 Samsun: 10 clubs

Amateur clubs are put into leagues included in the Amateur League system and are eligible for promotion to the Turkish Third League.

Largest football stadiums in Turkey

Cup competitions
The two major cup competitions are the Turkish Cup and Turkish Super Cup. The Turkish Cup includes clubs from every division. The Super Cup is an annual match held between the winners of the Süper Lig and Turkish Cup.

Now-defunct Turkish cup competitions include the Prime Minister's Cup, Atatürk Cup, Istanbul Football Cup and Spor Toto Cup.

Qualification for European competitions

In addition, once in a European competition, it becomes possible to qualify for others:
 All the losers of the Champions League third qualifying round go forward to the UEFA Europa League Play-off round
 All the losers of the Champions League play-off round go forward to the UEFA Europa League group stage
 Any clubs playing in the Champions League that finish third in the group stage go into the UEFA Europa League round of 32

European Competition Records

The following teams have made the last eight of European competitions:

UEFA Super Cup
Galatasaray (2000 – Champions)

European Cup / UEFA Champions League
Galatasaray (1988–89 – Semi-finals)
Galatasaray (1962–63 – Quarter-finals) 
Galatasaray (1969–70 – Quarter-finals)
Besiktaş (1986–87 – Quarter-finals)
Galatasaray (1993–94 – Group stage)‡
Galatasaray (2000–01 – Quarter-finals)
Fenerbahçe (2007–08 – Quarter-finals)
Trabzonspor (2010-11 – Group stage) (*Fenerbahçe excluded due to matchfixing scandal)

Galatasaray (2012–13 – Quarter-finals)

‡ Galatasaray was one of the eight teams in the group stage of the 1993–94 UEFA Champions League, however, UEFA does not consider this a quarter-final participation.

UEFA Cup / Europa League
Galatasaray (1999–00 – Champions)
Fenerbahçe (2012–13 – Semi-finals)
Besiktaş (2002–03 – Quarter-finals)
Besiktaş (2016–17 – Quarter-finals)

Inter-Cities Fairs Cup
Göztepe (1968–69 – Semi-finals)

Balkans Cup
Fenerbahçe (1966–67 – Champions)
Sarıyerspor (1991–92 – Champions)
Samsunspor (1993–94 – Champions)
Eskişehirspor (1975 – Runners-up)

UEFA Cup Winners Cup
Fenerbahçe (1963–64 – Quarter-finals)
Göztepe (1969–70 – Quarter-finals)
Bursaspor (1974–75 – Quarter-finals)
Galatasaray (1991–92 – Quarter-finals)

UEFA Intertoto Cup
Kayserispor (2006 – Joint Winners)
Trabzonspor (2007 – Runners-up)
Sivasspor (2008 – Runners-up)
İstanbulspor (1997 – Semi-finals)
Samsunspor (1998 – Semi-finals)
Trabzonspor (1999 – Semi-finals)
Bursaspor (1995 – Quarter-finals)

Turkey national team

The Turkey national team made its debut on October 26, 1923. The match ended in a 2–2 draw against the Romania. Turkey have qualified for the FIFA World Cup twice: 1954 and 2002. Their longest duration of competing for the Cup was coming third in the 2002 FIFA World Cup. Turkey also finished third in the 2003 Confederations Cup, reached the semi-finals of Euro 2008 and played in the quarter-finals of Euro 2000.

Women's football

Records

Seasons

See also
 List of Turkish football champions
 List of football clubs in Turkey
 Sport in Turkey
 Big Three (Turkey)
 Amputee football in Turkey

Notes

External links 
 TurkishFootballNews.com - your source for the latest in Turkish football 
 Turkish soccer live scores and newa and blog by Ahmet Bob Turgut 
 All of results in Turkish Football
 Turkish football instagram - goal videos, news, latest headlines

 

lt:Turkijos futbolo sistema